Kalyanji V. Mehta was an Indian politician who served as Speaker of Gujarat Legislative Assembly from 1 May 1960 to 19 August 1960.

References 

Year of birth missing (living people)
Living people
Speakers of the Gujarat Legislative Assembly
Gujarat MLAs 1960–1962